Improvement District No. 25, or Improvement District No. 25 (Willmore Wilderness), is an improvement district in Alberta, Canada. Coextensive with Willmore Wilderness Park in central Alberta, the improvement district provides local governance for lands within the park.

History 
Prior to 1994, those lands within Improvement District (ID) No. 25 were split between ID No. 14 and ID No. 16. Those lands within Willmore Wilderness Park were incorporated as ID No. 25 on January 2, 1994.

Geography

Communities 
There are no urban municipalities, hamlets, or urban service areas within Improvement District No. 25.

Demographics 
In the 2021 Census of Population conducted by Statistics Canada, Improvement District No. 25 had a population of 0 living in 0 of its 0 total private dwellings, no change from its 2016 population of 0.

Improvement District No. 25 was unpopulated and had no private dwellings according to the 2016 Census of Population conducted by Statistics Canada.

Government 
Improvement District No. 25 is governed by Alberta's Minister of Municipal Affairs.

See also 
List of communities in Alberta

References 

1994 establishments in Alberta

25